Frank Parsons was an Australian retired soccer player who played as a striker for the Australia national soccer team. He played his club football for Adamstown and Leichhardt-Annandale.

Early life
He attended Adamstown Public School.

Club career
Parsons began his senior club career with Adamstown before moving to Sydney to play for Leichhardt-Annandale.

He announced his retirement several times, citing scrutiny from referees and politics.

International career
In 1948 he made his debut for Australia in a match against New Zealand. Throughout the duration of his career, Parsons scored 16 goals for Australia including 6 in one game against New Zealand.

Career statistics

International

Scores and results list Australia's goal tally first, score column indicates score after each Australia goal.

After retirement

After retiring from football he decided to get in involved in Football administration joining the newly formed NSW Soccer Federation. He was later the principal for Excelsior Public School in Sydney. He was the principal of Shelley Public School Blacktown in 1966.

Parsons died in January 2021.

Honours
In 1999, Parsons was inducted into the Soccer Australia Hall of Fame (now known as the Football Australia Hall of Fame).

References

Living people
Australian soccer players
Australia international soccer players
Association football forwards
Year of birth missing (living people)